Bacitracin/polymyxin B (trade name Polysporin among others) is a topical antibiotic cream or ointment. The active ingredients are polymyxin B, bacitracin and occasionally garamycin or gramicidin. Though Polysporin is marketed in the United States, it holds a much smaller market share than in Canada and acts as a substitute to J&J's Neosporin for those allergic to the antibiotic neomycin; although allergy to Bacitracin/Polymyxin B has also been reported. There is also an ophthalmological ointment, eye and ear drops.

References

External links 
 Official Canadian Site
 Official U.S. Site

Combination antibiotics